The 2010 Aberto Santa Catarina de Tenis was a professional tennis tournament played on outdoor red clay courts. It was part of the 2010 ATP Challenger Tour. It took place in Blumenau, Brazil between 12 and 18 April 2010.

Single main-draw entrants

Seeds

 Rankings are as of April 5, 2010.

Other entrants
The following players received wildcards into the singles main draw:
  Guilherme Clézar
  Rodrigo Guidolin
  Tiago Fernandes
  Bruno Wolkmann

The following players received entry from the qualifying draw:
  Leonardo Kirche
  Tiago Lopes
  André Miele
  Iván Miranda

Champions

Singles

 Marcos Daniel def.  Bastian Knittel, 7–5, 6–7(5), 6–4

Doubles

 Franco Ferreiro /  André Sá def.  André Ghem /  Simone Vagnozzi, 6–4, 6–3

References
2010 Draws
Official website
ITF search 

Aberto Santa Catarina de Tenis
Aberto Santa Catarina de Tenis
Aberto Santa Catarina de Tenis
Aberto Santa Catarina de Tenis